In Bed with Santa is a Swedish black comedy film which was released to cinemas in Sweden on 26 November 1999, directed by Kjell Sundvall. A German remake was made in 2007 under the title Messy Christmas. A French remake was made in 2014 under the title Divin Enfant A Finnish remake was made in 2019 under the title Täydellinen joulu.

Plot
Sara invites her ex-husbands and their new families to celebrate Christmas with her and her husband Janne. Sara has always wanted to have a baby with Janne, and at the dinner table she reveals the news: she's pregnant. The only problem is that Janne had a vasectomy two years ago, without Sara knowing it. The secret starts to spread among the guests, and in no time everyone knows but Sara. The party heads for a complete disaster. Who's the real father?

Cast
Katarina Ewerlöf as Sara
Peter Haber as Jan
Jessica Zandén as Rita
Leif Andrée as Åke
Nina Gunke as Eva
Dan Ekborg as Gunnar
Lena B. Eriksson as Anne
Anders Ekborg as Thomas
Inga Ålenius as Signe
Carl Kjellgren as Erik
Helena af Sandeberg as Marika
Alexandra Dahlström as Jeanette
Stina Rautelin as Helena
Suzanne Reuter as Carina
Per Burell as Mats
Kajsa Ernst as Pauline
Lamine Dieng as the bus driver
Ester Sjögren as Elin
Tin Love Carlsson as Rickard
Lisa Ambjörn as Johanna
Sally Frejrud Carlsson as Liselotte
Viktor Schotte as Daniel
Molly Larsson as Patricia
Joel Cronström as Benny
Jill Johansson as Josefin
Neshwan Bakhet as Gustav

References

External links

1999 films
1990s black comedy films
Swedish black comedy films
Swedish Christmas comedy films
1990s Swedish-language films
Films directed by Kjell Sundvall
1990s Christmas films
1999 comedy films
1990s Swedish films